This is a list of iPod file managers. i.e. software that permits the transferring of media files content between an iPod and a computer or vice versa.

iTunes is the official iPod managing software, but 3rd parties have created alternatives to work around restrictions in iTunes. e.g. transferring content from an iPod to a computer is restricted by iTunes.

General

Media organization and transfer features

iPod syncing and maintenance features

iPhone & iPod Touch compatibility

See also
iPod
iTunes
iPhone

References

iPod Managers
 
ITunes